Steven William Thrasher (born c. 1978) is an American journalist and academic. In 2019, he became the inaugural Daniel H. Renberg Chair of social justice in reporting and an assistant professor of journalism at Northwestern University's Medill School of Journalism. In 2012, he won the National Lesbian and Gay Journalists Association Journalist of the Year award. His book The Viral Underclass was published in 2022.

Early life 
Steven Thrasher was born circa 1978 in Ventura, California and grew up in Oxnard, California. His parents, Margaret (d. 2007) and William "Bill" Thrasher (d. 2003), were white and Black respectively, and left Nebraska to marry in Iowa in 1958 because Nebraska law at the time barred the marriage.

Thrasher attended Oxnard High School where his father was a teacher. He graduated in 1995, then earned a BFA from New York University Tisch School of the Arts.

Career 
After graduating from Tisch, Thrasher worked as a script assistant on Saturday Night Live from 1999-2001, before working on the crews of several films including HBO Films' The Laramie Project. Beginning in 2007, he worked as an interviewer collecting oral histories for the StoryCorps Project, before becoming a staff writer at The Village Voice in 2009. In 2012, Thrasher was laid off from the Voice. He continued as a freelance journalist while working toward a doctorate in American studies from New York University in 2019. Thrasher's journalism has also appeared in The Guardian, Scientific American, The New York Times, and BuzzFeed.

In 2014, Thrasher was approached to investigate the story of Michael "Tiger Mandigo" Johnson, a young Black gay man near St. Louis who had been arrested for HIV transmission. Thrasher proceeded to publish a series of articles arguing that Johnson's conviction had been racially charged. Johnson was released five years into his 30.5 years sentence, an unprecedented 25 years early. Thrasher's coverage exposed how the HIV legislature reinforced stigma against patients and disincentivized people from getting tested, and how those affected by HIV criminalization, like Johnson, were often given unfair sentences. His work decriminalizing HIV led to his recognition as one of Out magazine's Out100 in 2019.

Thrasher also returned to St. Louis in 2014 to cover the uprisings after the killing of Michael Brown in Ferguson.

He was the recipient of the National Lesbian and Gay Journalists Association Journalist of the Year award 2012, and the Al Neuharth Award for Innovation in Investigative Journalism 2015. In 2017, he was inducted into the Hall of Fame for the American Sociological Association's journal Contexts, and in 2019, he was awarded a $75,000 Creativity and Free Expression grant from the Ford Foundation.

In 2019, Thrasher was appointed the inaugural Daniel H. Renberg Chair of social justice in reporting and an assistant professor of journalism at Northwestern University's Medill School of Journalism. As the student speaker at the 2019 convocation ceremony for NYU's Graduate School of Arts and Sciences, Thrasher expressed support for the Boycott, Divestment and Sanctions movement "against the apartheid state government in Israel". NYU president Andrew Hamilton rejected the possibility of a boycott and said Thrasher had omitted these comments from the version of the speech submitted for review.

The Viral Underclass
In August 2022, Thrasher published The Viral Underclass: The Human Toll When Inequality and Disease Collide with Celadon Books, an imprint of Macmillan. In it, Thrasher presents a series of case studies to argue that structural inequality increases the effect of viruses like HIV and COVID-19 on marginalized groups like people of color, disabled people, and LGBT people. The book received a starred review in Publishers Weekly. In The Boston Globe, Jennifer Latson called The Viral Underclass an "engaging, enraging read." In Nature, Jennifer Hochschild wrote, "Thrasher is an excellent investigator. The reader sees how and why the narratives develop in particular ways, and feels fury and despair, as well as occasional glimmers of hope. But the stories also leave lots of questions."

References

External links 

American investigative journalists
American newspaper reporters and correspondents
Living people
Year of birth missing (living people)
New York University alumni
Northwestern University faculty
American writers
American LGBT journalists
People from Ventura, California
African-American journalists